Ian David Gorham (born 30 November 1971) is a British businessman. He was the chief executive (CEO) of Hargreaves Lansdown plc, a British financial service company from 2010 to 2017.  Since 2017 he has been a stock market and fund investor and owner of businesses including Skyline Chess, Midgap Properties and Cookalong Kitchen.

Early life
He has a bachelor's degree in economics from the University of Warwick.

Career
He was CEO of Hargreaves Lansdown since September 2010, having joined in September 2009 as chief operating officer. He qualified as a chartered accountant in 1996. Previously he helped build Deloitte's financial services operations and from September 2003 – September 2009, worked for Grant Thornton International, rising to Partner and Head of their UK financial services business.

In September 2016, it was announced that Gorham would step down as CEO of Hargreaves Lansdown by September 2017, and would be succeeded by Chris Hill.

References

1971 births
Living people
British accountants
British chief executives
British corporate directors
Alumni of the University of Warwick